R (Wilson) v Prime Minister [2019] EWCA Civ 304 is a UK constitutional law case, involving judicial review of the Brexit Referendum in 2016. The claimants, including Wilson, argued that illegality through Russian interference, criminal overspending by Vote Leave and criminal investigation into the largest donor, Arron Banks, before and during the referendum undermined the integrity of the result, and rendered the decision to leave void. The application was refused in the High Court. In December 2018, the claimants lodged an appeal to the Court of Appeal. This was rejected on 21 February.

Facts

Wilson and three others claimed that the Prime Minister's notice to the European Union of the United Kingdom's intention to leave under Article 50 of the Treaty on European Union was invalid because of multiple findings fraud in the conduct of the referendum. These included, first, the findings of the Electoral Commission that "Vote Leave" officials were guilty of criminal offences for overspending nearly £450,000, second, the Information Commissioner Office criminal penalty against Facebook for enabling unlawful appropriation of UK voters' personal data and use in targeted political advertising, and third, the conclusion of the House of Commons Digital, Culture, Media and Sport Committee on ‘Fake News’ that Russia had engaged in "unconventional warfare" through social media to manipulate UK voters. It was also submitted that it was relevant that the National Crime Agency was investigating Arron Banks, the largest donor to Brexit, for being unable to show that his donation came from UK sources. The claimants argued that, on the basis of Ashby v White and  Morgan v Simpson that the irregularities in the vote rendered the process of the referendum unlawful at common law: the extensive fraud that had been uncovered corrupted the integrity of the vote. It followed that the decision by the prime minister, Theresa May, to notify the EU of the intention to leave was based on a flawed premise that the referendum could be said to reflect the "will of the people". The Prime Minister argued that the application for judicial review was out of time, that the problems of fraud were well known, and that the Prime Minister had not, therefore, been irrational.

Judgment

High Court
Ouseley J held that the claim was unduly delayed, and further added that the basis for judicial review lacked "merit". The Court of Appeal decision in Morgan v Simpson, where Lord Denning MR held that votes must be declared void if they substantially violate the law, "relies on quite old cases" and "none of which deal with a referendum". The Venice Commission requirements for a fair question in a referendum and the European Convention on Human Rights added "nothing in this context".

Court of Appeal
The Court of Appeal of two judges rejected an appeal from Ouseley J's refusal to allow permission on 21 February, holding that the claim was both out of time and lacked merit, and it further refused to appeal to the Supreme Court. Its written judgment was reserved, and did not give reasons at the oral hearing for its decision.

See also

UK constitutional law
Russian interference in the 2016 Brexit referendum

Notes

References
E McGaughey, 'Could Brexit be Void?' (2018) King's Law Journal and on SSRN

External links
UK in EU Challenge: website of the claimants

United Kingdom constitutional case law
Consequences of Brexit
Consequences of the 2016 United Kingdom European Union membership referendum